Happy Valley station may refer to:

 Happy Valley station (Beijing Subway), a station on Line 7 of the Beijing Subway
 Happy Valley station (Chongqing Rail Transit), a station on Line 6 of the Chongqing Rail Transit
 Happy Valley Terminus, a tram stop in Hong Kong
 Happy Valley railway station, a closed railway station in Adelaide, South Australia